The southern pygmy mouse (Baiomys musculus) is a species of rodent in the family Cricetidae.
It is found in El Salvador, Guatemala, Honduras, Mexico, and Nicaragua.

Habitat 

Coastal animals are larger on average. They prefer open canopy areas with grasses and less dead wood or bare ground. In general they are found in open areas with thick low vegetation. They are also found in rocky areas.

Description 

The outer coat of the southern pygmy mouse varies from a reddish brown to almost black. The under belly is lighter in tone than the back ranging from pinkish buff to white. Juveniles are born with a gray coat that slowly turns brown as they mature. Uncharacteristically of other members in the family Cricetidae they have 14 cheek teeth instead of 12.

Reproduction 

Breeding occurs year-round but rates are not constant throughout the year. During the winter and spring there are fewer litters born. Individuals living in grassy areas dig burrows for nesting while others in rocky areas live under rocks.

Synonyms:
Baiomys brunneus (J. A. Allen and Chapman, 1897)
Baiomys nigrescens (Osgood, 1904)
Baiomys grisescens (Goldman, 1932)
Baiomys infernatis (Hooper, 1952)
Baiomys pallidus (Russell, 1952)
Baiomys handleyi (Packard, 1958)
Baiomys pullus (Packard, 1958)
Baiomys nebulosus (Goodwin, 1959)

References

 Baillie, J. 1996.  Baiomys musculus.   2006 IUCN Red List of Threatened Species.   Downloaded on 19 July 2007.
Musser, G. G. and M. D. Carleton. 2005. Superfamily Muroidea. pp. 894–1531 in Mammal Species of the World a Taxonomic and Geographic Reference. D. E. Wilson and D. M. Reeder eds. Johns Hopkins University Press, Baltimore.

Baiomys
Mammals described in 1892
Taxonomy articles created by Polbot
Taxa named by Clinton Hart Merriam